Thomas Nicholson is a health educator and drug policy specialist. He was reportedly included on President Obama's shortlist of candidates for the appointment as the nation's "drug czar" and was endorsed for the position by numerous public health groups. He has coordinated the DRUGNET Study, an on-line survey of adult drug users.

He earned his M.P.H. in at the University of Texas School of Public Health and his Ph.D. in at Southern Illinois University at Carbondale. He also earned an M.A.Ed. in counseling from Western Kentucky University.

References

External links
 WKU Department of Public Health

American drug policy reform activists
American health educators
State University of New York at Brockport alumni
UTHealth School of Public Health alumni
Southern Illinois University alumni
Western Kentucky University alumni